The Document on Human Fraternity for World Peace and Living Together, also known as the Abu Dhabi declaration or Abu Dhabi agreement, is a joint statement signed by Pope Francis of the Catholic Church and Sheikh Ahmed el-Tayeb, Grand Imam of Al-Azhar, on 4 February 2019 in Abu Dhabi, United Arab Emirates. The document was born of a fraternal open discussion between Francis and Tayeb and is concerned with how different faiths can live peacefully in the same world, and it is meant to be a guide on advancing a "culture of mutual respect".

The Higher Committee of Human Fraternity has been established instituted to fulfill the aspirations of the Document on Human Fraternity internationally. The principles of compassion and human solidarity embodied in this text are the same ones that later inspired the declaration designating February 4 as the International Day of Human Fraternity, as indicated by UN Secretary-General António Guterres. 

In his 2020 encyclical Fratelli tutti, Pope Francis stated that the Document on Human Fraternity "was no mere diplomatic gesture, but a reflection born of dialogue and common commitment."

Basic concept 
The Document is concerned with how different faiths can live peaceably in the same world and areas. In the declaration:

 Francis and Tayeb "declare the adoption of a culture of dialogue as the path; mutual cooperation as the code of conduct; reciprocal understanding as the method and standard."
 They called on world leaders "to work strenuously to spread the culture of tolerance and of living together in peace; to intervene at the earliest opportunity to stop the shedding of innocent blood and bring an end to wars, conflicts, environmental decay and the moral and cultural decline that the world is presently experiencing."
 They asked leaders and would-be influencers "to rediscover the values of peace, justice, goodness, beauty, human fraternity and coexistence in order to confirm the importance of these values as anchors of salvation for all, and to promote them everywhere."
 They said that "Terrorism is deplorable and threatens the security of people, be they in the East or the West, the North or the South, and disseminates panic, terror and pessimism, but this is not due to religion, even when terrorists instrumentalize it. It is due, rather, to an accumulation of incorrect interpretations of religious texts and to policies linked to hunger, poverty, injustice, oppression and pride."

Details 
The Document suggests one chain of causality for religious and national extremism: "a moral deterioration" in international action and "a weakening of spiritual values" causing "frustration, isolation and desperation", leading some to fall "into a vortex of […] extremism", leading some to "individual or collective self-destruction". 

The body of the document has a paragraph to uphold each of these values:

 "Peace";
 "Freedom […] of every person";
 "Justice based on mercy";
 "Dialogue" in order to promote "peace" and "tolerance", noting that "dialogue among believers" needs to avoid "unproductive discussions";
 "protection of places of worship";
 The necessity "to stop […] terrorism", particularly naming "financing, the provision of weapons", and "using media […] to justify" terrorism;
 "Full citizenship";
 "[G]ood relations between East and West";
 "The right of women";
 "Protection of the fundamental rights of children";
 "Protection of the rights of the elderly, the weak, the disabled, and the oppressed".

Response and criticism

Diversity of religions 
Some commentary on the Document focuses on alleged "novel theological formulations ... and questionable assertions of facts", particularly in a passage concerning God's will with regard to the diversity of religions:

Chad Pecknold, a systematic theologian at the Catholic University of America, assesses this claim as "fitting [...] [i]n sensitive inter-religious contexts, [...] but some may find it puzzling to hear the Vicar of Christ talk about God willing the diversity of religions". Adam Rasmussen, a lecturer in Christian theology at Georgetown University, hails "the pope's praiseworthy attempt" by quoting "St. (Mother) Teresa", Nostra aetate and Evangelii gaudium, thereby suspecting "that Francis may be at least somewhat familiar with his fellow Jesuit" Jacques Dupuis and his book Toward a Christian Theology of Religious Pluralism.

See also 
 Abrahamic Family House
 Nostra aetate
 Catholic social teaching
 Extra Ecclesiam nulla salus
 Fratelli tutti
 Christianity and Islam
 Human rights in the Quran
 International Day of Human Fraternity
 Parliament of the World's Religions

Notes

References

Sources

External links
 
 

2019 in Christianity
2019 documents
2019 in Vatican City
2019 in the United Arab Emirates
Christianity and other religions
Human rights
Sunni Islam
Interfaith dialogue
Documents of Pope Francis
Holy See–United Arab Emirates relations
Abrahamic Family House
Christian and Islamic interfaith dialogue